Marie-Jo Thério (born July 3, 1965 in Shediac, New Brunswick) is a Canadian actress and musician. She is most noted for her performance in the 1999 film Full Blast, for which she won the Jutra Award for Best Supporting Actress at the 3rd Jutra Awards in 2001.

Raised in Shediac and Moncton, she moved to Montreal at age 17 to pursue work as a musician and actress. She appeared in Michel Tremblay's musical play Nelligan in 1990, in the television series Chambres en ville in 1991 and in the film Forbidden Love: The Unashamed Stories of Lesbian Lives in 1992 before releasing her debut album Comme de la musique in 1995.

In 2006 she won the Félix Award for Folk Album of the Year for her album Les matins habitables.

Filmography

Film

Television

Discography
 1995: Comme de la musique
 2000: La Maline
 2004: Les Matins habitables
 2011: Chasing Lydie
 2014: Trois petits tours d'automne

References

External links

1965 births
Living people
Acadian people
Actresses from New Brunswick
Canadian film actresses
Canadian television actresses
Canadian stage actresses
Canadian musical theatre actresses
Canadian women singer-songwriters
Canadian singer-songwriters
Félix Award winners
French-language singers of Canada
Musicians from Moncton
People from Shediac
20th-century Canadian actresses
20th-century Canadian women singers
21st-century Canadian actresses
21st-century Canadian women singers
Audiogram (label) artists
Best Supporting Actress Jutra and Iris Award winners